Isabelle Cambourakis is a French freelance editor and researcher. She is known for having created the feminist collection "Sorcières", of which she is editorial director, within the publishing house Cambourakis.

Life 
A teacher, Isabelle Cambourakis created the “Sorcières” collection in 2015 for Cambourakis editions, founded by her brother Frédéric Cambourakis. In 2017, after resuming studies, she obtained a master's degree in research, her thesis focusing on the links between feminist and environmental movements in the 1970s.

The collection, founded in 2015, defined itself as feminist, intersectional and anti-capitalist. Initially, Isabelle Cambourakis' objective was to make known American texts from the 1970s, out of print or never translated, of 2nd wave feminism. It is inspired by the editorial line of the "Le Rayon Gay" collection created in the 1990s by Guillaume Dustan at Balland editions. The first book published was a text by the author and ecofeminist activist Starhawk, prefaced by the philosopher Émilie Hache. The second seminal work in the collection is Witches, Midwives and Nurses by Barbara Ehrenreich and Deirdre English.

In November 2019, the collection opened up to children's literature with the album Like a million black butterflies by Laura Nsafou and Barbara Brun. Inspired by Toni Morrisson's phrase "her clothes were white and her hair was like a million black butterflies", the book tells the story of a little black girl, Adé, who is made fun of by her classmates because of her frizzy hair. Selling 10,000 copies, it is the best-selling children's book in the catalogue.

She attaches importance to intersectionality and the articulation of different struggles, which explains the diversity of themes addressed by the collection: ecofeminism (Reclaim by Émilie Hache), sexuality (Peau by Dorothy Allison), trans-identity (Manifesto of a trans woman by Julia Serano), black feminism (Am I not a woman? by bell hooks), and decolonial struggles.

The collection is called “Witches” in reference to an Italian slogan from 1976: “Tremate, tremate, le streghe son tornade” (“Tremble, tremble, the witches are back”). She is known for popularizing, outside university circles, feminist and ecofeminist thinking, and participated in the revaluation of the feminist figure of the witch. Between 2015 and 2017, she wrote a series of articles for the environmental review Silence.

References 

French editors

Living people
Year of birth missing (living people)